Synanthedon acerni, the maple callus borer, is a moth of the family Sesiidae. It is found in Western Canada and much of the Eastern United States.

The wingspan is 18–25 mm. The moths are on wing from June to July, but in the United States from April on.

The larvae feed on Acer species.

External links
Species info
Synanthedon at funet
Range in the United States

Sesiidae
Moths of North America
Moths described in 1860